Jean Bourdon  ( – 1668) was the first engineer-in-chief and land-surveyor in the colony of New France, and the first attorney-general of the Conseil Superieur.

Bourdon came to New France in 1634 and he was designated as the engineer to Governor Charles de Montmagny. He also built a chapel on it for his friend, Abbé Jean Le Sueur. This was only one of several seigneuries that Bourdon received.

References
 
 

1600s births
1668 deaths
People of New France